Leading chess players from the FIDE Oceania Zone 3.6 are allowed to play in the Oceania Chess Championships.  The tournament is conducted by the FIDE Oceania Zone President and Oceania Chess Confederation under the auspices of the world chess federation, FIDE.

History
Before January 2012, the Oceania Chess Championship was scheduled as part of the FIDE World Chess Championship cycle, and winners qualified to represent the FIDE Oceania Zone at the Chess World Cup.  Since 2012 the Oceania Chess Championship has been held every year, with only each alternate (odd numbered) year acting as the Oceania Zone Championship and Chess World Cup qualifier. In these years, the title of International Master (IM) is awarded to the winner(s) of the Oceania Zone Championship event, as per the FIDE title regulations.

The first Oceania Chess Championship was organised by the inaugural Oceania Zone President, Graeme Gardiner, on the Gold Coast, Australia in 1999. Vladimir Feldman of Australia won the event, undefeated, with a score of 7/9. In May 2000, an additional Oceania Zonal Chess Championship was held to coincide with changes in the schedule of the FIDE World Chess Championship cycle. Only an open event was held that year, without a separate women's championship, and was won by Aleksandar Wohl with a score of 7.5/9.

In 2001, Mikhail Gluzman and Mark Chapman shared first place with a score of 7/9, but the former won a rapid chess play-off match and the title. In 2011 the Women's event resulted in a tie between Irina Berezina and Emma Guo. A playoff match was held later in the year in Sydney, and was won by Berezina with a score of 2.5/3. The 2013 Women's event again resulted in a tie between Irina Berezina and Emma Guo. Berezina won the playoff match, at the end of the tournament, with a score of 2/2.  In 2015, untitled player Brodie McClymont beat IM Max Illingworth in the last round to catch him for 1st= with scores of 7.5/9, which means an automatic IM title. Illingworth beat McClymont 1.5–0.5 in the rapid chess playoff match for Zonal Champion.

Oceania Chess Champions
{| class="sortable wikitable"
! Year !! City !! Open Champion !! Women's Champion
|-
| 1999  ||       Gold Coast  ||       || 
|-
| 2000 ||       Auckland  ||       || 
|-
| 2001
  ||	Gold Coast	||	  || 
|-
| 2002  ||	Coral Coast	||	  || 
|-
| 2005 ||	Auckland	||	        || 
|-
| 2007  ||       Denarau     ||         || 
|-
| 2009 ||	Gold Coast	||	    || 
|-
| 2011
||	Rotorua	||	   || 
|-
| 2012 
||	Queenstown	||	  || 
|-
| 2013 ||	Nadi	||	  || 
|-
| 2014 ||	Ballarat	||	  || 
|-
| 2015 ||	Sydney	||	  	  ||
|-
| 2016 ||       Auckland		|| 	  ||
|-
| 2017 ||       Auckland		||
|
|-

|2019
|Guam
|
|
|-

|2021
|Online chess
|
|
|-

|2023 
|Melbourne
|
|

|}

Oceania Senior Chess Champions
{| class="sortable wikitable"
! Year !! City !! Senior Champion !! Senior Women's Champion
|-
| 2010 ||	Christchurch	||	    || 
|-
| 2011
||	Melbourne	||	   || 
|-
| 2012
||	Parramatta	||	  || 
|-
| 2013 ||	Christchurch	||	  ||  
|-
| 2014 ||	Sydney	||	  ||
|-
| 2015 ||	Auckland	||	  ||
|-
| 2016 ||Nadi||||
|-
| 2019  ||Auckland||||

|-
| 2021 ||Noosa||Cancelled due to COVID	  ||Cancelled due to COVID

|}

Oceania Youth Chess Champions
{| class="sortable wikitable"
! Year !! City !! Youth Champion !! Youth Girls Champion

|-
| 2023 ||Canberra||
|
|}

Oceania Presidents

See also

References

External links
Oceania Chess Confederation website

Supranational chess championships
Women's chess competitions
Chess
Chess in Oceania
Recurring sporting events established in 1999
1999 establishments in Australia